The Gnome Reserve is a garden and tourist attraction in West Putford, near Bradworthy, Devon, England, presented as a pastoral refuge for garden gnomes.

The reserve was established in 1979 by Ann Atkin, a former art student. Her account states:"…while painting birds in landscapes I came to what was like a T Junction in my painting development. I did not know whether to turn left or right as different elements of what I liked in painting appeared irreconcilably in opposite directions. It was very disturbing! Until – one day – a gnome appeared in my mind and seemed to say: ‘Don’t go left; don’t go right; you must dig / build your own road straight across.’…

Gnome merchandise is sold to visiting tourists. The reserve holds more than 2,000 gnomes and is included in the Guinness Book of World Records. The four-acre reserve also has model pixies. The area includes woodlands, a stream, pond, meadow and wildflower garden with "about 250 labelled species of wildflowers, herbs, grasses and ferns." Photographs are allowed and encouraged. Gnome hats and fishing rods are loaned to visitors free of charge. It is not uncommon for some Gnomes to eventually get taken by the visitors. The Reserve has refused to sell gnomes with knives on their backs.

See also 
Watermouth Castle, also in North Devon, which is home to Gnome Land, a gnome themed amusement park.

References

External links
Gnome Reserve website
 Tourist leaflet
 BBC News, The woman obsessed with gnomes, 5 September 2013

Gnomes
Gardens in Devon
Torridge District